Plogoff is a commune in the Finistère department of Brittany in north-western France.

It contains three small ports suitable for small vessels: Pors-Loubous, Feunten-Aod and Bestrée. Local industries include tourism, traditional biscuits, agriculture and fishing.

Population
Inhabitants of Plogoff are called in French Plogoffistes.

Toponymy
As for other cities like Guiscriff, Plélauff or the surnames Le Hénaff, Heussaff or Gourcuff, the digraph -ff was introduced by Middle Ages' authors to indicate a nasalized vowel.

Geography

Historically, Plogoff belongs to Cornouaille.

Maps

Nuclear plant project
In the early 1970s, the French state power company, EDF, decided to establish a nuclear power plant in Brittany. The first proposed site was in Erdeven, Morbihan, but objections arose. EDF then proposed Ploumoguer, Finistère, just north of Brest. Councilmen around Brest redirected their attention to Plogoff. Local residents then blocked access to the site in 1976, while protests resumed in 1978 and 1979.

In 1980, the national government and EDF attempted to fulfil their statutory obligations to display the required inquiry documents in the local mairie or city hall. Local officials burned the documents and refused to allow replacements to be displayed. In response, the national government set up mobile mairies annexes to display the documents in town centres.  These mairies annexes became the focus of the protest movement.

For 45 days, the riot police (CRS), the military police (gendarmerie) and some parachutists (EPIGN) guarded the mairies annexes while coming under attack from the protesters.

Once the obligation to display the documents had been met, the protesters occupied the proposed site.

In 1981 François Mitterrand was elected President of France.  Mitterrand carried out his campaign promise to cancel the project.

A documentary Plogoff, des pierres contre des fusils (Plogoff, stones against rifles) relating the struggle against the French security forces was later produced by Nicole and Félix Le Garrec.

See also
Communes of the Finistère department
List of the works of the Maître de Plougastel

References

Gallery

External links

Official website 

Bretons against Plogoff nuclear plant 

Communes of Finistère
Nuclear history of France
Populated coastal places in France